Tajrish Metro Station is the northern terminus station of Tehran Metro Line 1. It is also the northernmost Tehran Metro station. It is located in the area called Tajrish, district 1 municipality in northern Tehran, Iran. The station is located at Qods Square, in the northernmost section of Shariati Street.  It has an area of 150,000 sq.m with 16 escalators and 8 elevators. The Tajrish Metro Station was inaugurated on 19 February 2012.

References

External links 

Tehran Metro stations